A Time & Place is the second studio album by reggae artist Julian Marley, released in 2003 on Lightyear Entertainment.

Tracks
Father's Place (4:03)
Where She Lay (5:53)
Harder Dayz (4:22)
Build Together (4:02)
Summer Daisies (5:53)
One Way Train (4:28)
Systems (3:44)
I'll Never (5:00)
Sitting in the Dark (4:35)
Rock With Me (4:28)
Sunshine (4:10)
Couldn't Be The Place (3:53)
Time (5:02)

Notes

1996 albums
Julian Marley albums